Ola Oluwa is a Local Government Area in Osun State, Nigeria. Its headquarters are in the town of Bode Osi. It's was formally called Iwo North Local Government on establishment, which was formally changed after the death of ọba abímbólá, the then Oluwo of Iwo. It's now as another Local Government making two which is Ola Oluwa South East LCD A, Ilemowu.

It has an area of 328 km and a population of 76,593 according to the 2006 census.

The Local Government has two functioning private institution and one under construction, which are; Westland university, in iwara; Wolex polytechnic, iwara; and Mercy Medical University, Ìkirè ilé.

The postal code of the area is 232.

References

Local Government Areas in Osun State